Krajna  is a former village in the administrative district of Gmina Bircza, within Przemyśl County, Subcarpathian Voivodeship, in south-eastern Poland.

On the site of the village is the disused Arłamów Airport.

References

Krajna